is a Japanese voice actress and singer from Yamanashi Prefecture who is affiliated with Stardust Promotion. As a singer, she is signed to Universal Music Japan. Some of her main roles include Kuroyukihime in Accel World, Sakura Bakushin O in Uma Musume, Minami Azuma in Tokyo ESP, Rin in the music video for Shelter, Yukari Kohinata in Locodol, Sakura "Cosmos" Akino in Oresuki, and Moca Aoba in BanG Dream!.

Biography
Misawa began her voice acting career after winning the "Kadokawa×Up-Front Style Idol Seiyū Audition 2008" competition in February 2009. She debuted in the anime Shangri-La, voicing the character Yuri Gamagori. She graduated from high school in March 2011 and entered university in April of that same year. She finally graduated from university in March 2016. She took a part-time job as a shrine maiden at the age of 20, having been fascinated with it since her childhood. Despite already being preoccupied with voice acting and furthering her studies, she accepted it as a lifelong opportunity.

In 2012, she landed a major role as Kuroyukihime from Accel World. In this anime also, she was involved in the second ending with her debut single "Unite" released on August 1, 2012, under the label Warner Bros. Home Entertainment Japan.

She released her debut album Polaris on February 20, 2013. The album contains music that were used in the film Toaru Majutsu no Index: Endymion no Kiseki.  Misawa's second single  was released on August 21, 2013, and it was used as second ending theme for the anime television series A Certain Scientific Railgun S. Her third single, Faith, was released on 6 August 2014, which was the ending song of Argevollen. In 2016, she released her best album named -Infinite Selection-.

While previously she communicated mostly on her official blog, she opened a Twitter account on 13 January 2019, on her 26th birthday.

During her birthday event in 2020, Misawa announced that she will be releasing new album in the Spring of 2020 under a big label,  which was later revealed to be Universal Music Japan. The single will be released on 29 April 2020. Also at this event, she announced her official fan club named "Sachi Cafe". The fan club became defunct after she left her agency.

She released her second single on September 30, 2020 titled "I’m here/With You". She wrote the lyrics and composed the music herself for "I'm here".

She released her first major original album "I Am Me" under Universal Music Japan on December 23, 2020. In this album, she wrote the lyrics and composed the music herself for "Aoi Namida".

On December 26, 2020, Misawa announced she was leaving Space Craft Entertainment at end of December 2020, and will work freelance after leaving the agency. She used to run a YouTube channel called "Misawa no Sacchanel" (三澤のさっちゃんねる), but the channel was shut down together with her blog "Sachika Diary" (さちかにっき) after she left the agency.

She joined Stardust Promotion on April 1, 2021. She re-opened her fan club with the new name "Seeker" on June 10, 2021  and re-opened her official blog on Line Blog on June 24, 2021.

She released a mini-album "Shin-kokyu" (深呼吸) consisting of five songs on December 22, 2021, roughly one year after her previous album. She wrote and composed for three songs "Utau yo" (歌うよ), "Toumei Ningen" (透明人間), and "Hitomi" (瞳). In the interview with UtaTen, she mentioned that all of the songs in this album were intentionally made exactly 3 minutes 0 seconds length because of the hourglass duration included in her limited edition box from Universal Music Japan.

During her birthday event in 2022, she announced her first ever solo live, which was held in Osaka on March 6, 2022, and Tokyo on April 3rd, 2022.

In February 2022, she had her live-action television drama debut in Kasouken no Onna (科捜研の女) Season 21. She narrated the audiobook for the novel Oshi, Moyu (推し、燃ゆ) which released on February 8, 2022. 

Misawa revealed in June 2022 that she would be taking a hiatus from her activities due to poor health. As a result, her scheduled concert, "Misawa Sachika 2nd Live Tour 2022", as well as her fan event, "Misawa Sachika FC Fan Meeting", have been canceled. She returned to activity in August 2022. 

Her sample voice is used for the voice synthesis software "Seishunkei Song Voice CeVIO AI Futaba Minato" which was released on December 2, 2022 

She released her best album entitled "REMEDY" to celebrate 10 years since her CD debut on December 21, 2022. This album consists of 12 songs which included 1 new song.  

On March 15, 2023 Misawa announced she is leaving  Stardust Promotion by March 31, 2023.

Current and Past Activities 
She previously had a weekly solo radio program called Misawa Sachika no Radio wo Kiku Janne! (三澤紗千香のラジオを聴くじゃんね！) which aired on 超！Ａ＆Ｇ＋ on every Tuesday 2 am (Monday 26 pm as written in Japanese). However, this program was stopped after she went on hiatus in June 2022.

She also hosted the BanG Dream! weekly radio show Sunset Studio with fellow Afterglow member Hisako Kanemoto. She also had a biweekly radio program called Nashiraji (梨ラジ) together with Natsumi Takamori which promotes Yamanashi prefecture, which ran from October 10, 2019 until November 22, 2021. She co-hosted Oresuki Radio with radio personality Takeshi Washizaki.　She also has a weekly radio program called “Let’s Become a Novelist Navi” with Junta Terashima since April 2019 before she graduated from this radio program on September 25, 2022. This radio show introduced some works from the website Let's Become Novelist (小説家になろう) via live reading,  

Aside from the radio, she also has monthly game streaming programs with Komagata Yuri which airs on Niconico.

She also began her personal YouTube channel in addition to her artist YouTube channel on October 14, 2021.

She was also part of the Idol舞Show as Hanazono Yuika in No Princess Sub-Unit before she graduated from the group on 22 June 2020.

Filmography

Anime
2009
Shangri-La as Yuri Gamagori
Yumeiro Patissiere as Cafe; Miki Mori

2010
Kaitō Reinya as Beautiful lady (ep 11); Fan; Sparrow (ep 6)
Yumeiro Patissiere SP as Cafe; Miki Mori

2012
Accel World as Kuroyukihime
Campione! as Arianna
Nakaimo - My Sister Is Among Them! as Student (ep 2)
Saki Achiga-hen episode of Side-A as Hiroko Funakubo (ep. 13 onwards)

2013
Chronicles of the Going Home Club as Reina Takamodo
Kin-iro Mosaic as Female classmate AA Certain Magical Index: The Movie – The Miracle of Endymion as Arisa MeigoTenshi no Drop as MomokoFantasista Doll as Kagami Totori

2014Riddle Story of Devil as Chitaru NamatameAldnoah.Zero as Rayet AreashWitch Craft Works as Witch ATokyo ESP as Minami AzumaBakumatsu Rock as IkumatsuLocodol as Yukari Kohinata47 Prefectural Dog R as Yamanishi Dog

2015Aldnoah.Zero 2 as Rayet AreashCastle Town Dandelion as Sachiko Yonezawa

2016Nyanbo! as KijitoraAccel World: Infinite Burst as Kuroyukihime
 Shelter (music video) as Rin

2017Sakurada Reset as Seika NonooTomica Hyper Rescue Drive Head Kidō Kyūkyū Keisatsu as Mikoto Ishino

2018BanG Dream! Girls Band Party! Pico as Moca AobaButlers: Chitose Momotose Monogatari as Tenna KisaragiMagical Girl Ore as Sakuyo Mikage

2019BanG Dream! 2nd Season as Moca AobaBanG Dream! Film Live as Moca AobaBakugan: Battle Planet as KravitzOresuki as Sakura "Cosmos" Akino

2020BanG Dream! 3rd Season as Moca AobaBanG Dream! Girls Band Party! Pico: Ohmori as Moca AobaIwa-Kakeru! Climbing Girls as Mimu TakahashiBakugan: Armored Alliance as Kravitz

2021BanG Dream! Episode of Roselia II: Song I am. as Moca AobaBanG Dream! Film Live 2nd Stage as Moca AobaBanG Dream! Girls Band Party! Pico Fever! as Moca AobaUma Musume Pretty Derby Season 2 – as Sakura Bakushin OWonder Egg Priority as Kaoru Kurita

2022The Yakuza's Guide to Babysitting as Sanae Aoi 

Video games
2013Akiba's Trip 2 as Shizuku TokikazeMugen Souls Z as SyrmaSword Art Online: Infinity Moment as Strea
2014Dengeki Bunko Fighting Climax as KuroyukihimeBullet GirlsSword Art Online: Hollow Fragment as StreaGirl Friend Beta as Shiki Nanami
2015Honyarara Magic as Hikari HashimotoSword Art Online: Lost Song as Strea
2016Granblue Fantasy as ForteSword Art Online: Hollow Realization as Strea
2017Accel World VS Sword Art Online: Millennium Twilight as Kuroyukihime and Strea BanG Dream! Girls Band Party! as Moca AobaInfinite Stratos: Archetype Breaker as Loranzine Lorandifilny
2018Sword Art Online: Fatal Bullet as Strea Master of Eternity as DeviDragon Star Varnir as Charlotta 
2019Fire Emblem: Three Houses as Hapi Engage Princess as Lemres
2020Dragalia Lost as Forte 
2021Touhou Danmaku Kagura as Konpaku YoumuSakura Kakumei  as Tenjin HimekaUma Musume Pretty Derby as Sakura Bakushin OAzur Lane as Marco PoloGuardian Tales as AishaOnsen Musume as Mikasa SengokuharaFairy Sphere as Houzuki (Sister)
Cookie Run: Kingdom as Poison Mushroom Cookie

2022Echoes of Mana as MousselineAlice Fiction as Archimedes Your Majesty'' as Manya
Sengoku Sairin as Matsu

Live-Action Television 
2021

 Kasouken no Onna (科捜研の女) Season21 as Nana Honjo.

Discography

Singles

Albums

Mini albums

References

External links
  at Universal Music Japan 
  in Warner Bros Japan  – former recording label
 Sachika Misawa profile at Stardust Promotion (in Japanese)
Sachika Misawa Official Fanclub (in Japanese)
Sachika Misawa on Twitter (in Japanese) (January 13, 2019–present)
Sachika Misawa on Instagram (in Japanese with some English translation) (April 1, 2021–present)
Sachika Misawa on Line (in Japanese)  (June 24, 2021–present)
Sachika Misawa Youtube Channel (in Japanese) (October 14, 2021–present)
 

1993 births
Living people
Anime singers
Japanese video game actresses
Japanese voice actresses
Musicians from Yamanashi Prefecture
Universal Music Japan artists
Voice actresses from Yamanashi Prefecture
21st-century Japanese singers
21st-century Japanese women singers
People from Yamanashi Prefecture
Actors from Yamanashi Prefecture